Hengshan Picardie Hotel is an Art-Deco five-star hotel in Shanghai, China.

See also
 Hengshan Road
 Park Hotel, Shanghai
 Broadway Mansions

References

Art Deco architecture in Shanghai
Hotels in Shanghai
Hotel buildings completed in 1934
1934 establishments in China